Nationality words link to articles with information on the nation's poetry or literature (for instance, Irish or France).

Events

Works published

Great Britain
 Anonymous, An Antidote Against Melancholy, one of the most important and earliest collections of "drolleries"
 Alexander Brome, Songs and Other Poems
 John Bunyan, Profitable Meditations Fitted to Mans Different Condition, the author's first prison work and first published verse
 John Dryden, To His Sacred Majesty, a Panegyrick on his Coronation, Charles II of England was crowned April 23 this year
 John Evelyn, A Panegyric to Charles the Second
 Edmund Waller, A Poem on St James's Park
 George Wither, The Prisoners Plea

Other
 Anders Arrebo, Hexaemeron, poem describing the six days of Creation, written c. 1622, published posthumously

Births
Death years link to the corresponding "[year] in poetry" article:
 April – Anne Finch, Countess of Winchilsea, born Anne Kingsmill (died 1720), English poet
 April 16 – Charles Montagu, 1st Earl of Halifax (died 1715), English poet and statesman
 Johanna Eleonora De la Gardie (died 1708), German-born Swedish poet and noble
 Takarai Kikaku 宝井其角, also known as "Enomoto Kikaku" (died 1707), Japanese haiku poet and disciple of Matsuo Bashō
 Approximate date
 William Cleland (died 1689), Scottish poet and soldier
 Samuel Garth (died 1719), English physician and poet
 John Tutchin (died 1707), English radical Whig controversialist, gadfly journalist and poet

Deaths
Birth years link to the corresponding "[year] in poetry" article:
 February 12 – August Buchner (born 1591), German poet and critic
 October 2 – Barten Holyday (born 1593), English clergyman, author and poet
 December 29 – Antoine Girard de Saint-Amant (born 1594), French poet
 Approximate date
 Antonio Enríquez Gómez (born c. 1601), Spanish dramatist, poet and novelist
 María de Zayas (born 1590), Spanish poet and playwright

See also

 Poetry
 17th century in poetry
 17th century in literature
 Restoration literature

Notes

17th-century poetry
Poetry